Selina Mary Scott (born 13 May 1951) is an English television presenter who co-hosted the first dedicated breakfast television programme in the UK before crossing the Atlantic to join West 57th, a prime-time current-affairs show broadcast from New York. Scott continues to write, and run her lifestyle brand Naturally Selina Scott.

Early life and education
Scott was born in Scarborough, North Riding of Yorkshire, in 1951. Her secondary education was at Laurence Jackson School in Guisborough, North Yorkshire where she became Head Girl. She read English and American studies at the University of East Anglia.

Journalism 
Scott trained in Dundee, Scotland on D. C. Thomson's The Sunday Post newspaper, once lauded in Guinness World Records as having the "highest per capita readership in the world", before becoming press officer for the Highlands and Islands Tourist board on the Isle of Bute. She made her television debut on the weeknightly news programme for the regional ITV station Grampian Television, North Tonight in Aberdeen at the height of the North Sea oil boom.

British television 
Several months after North Tonight began, Scott, aged 29, moved to national TV, appearing as a newsreader on ITN's News at Ten. In 1982, at the outbreak of the Falklands War, Scott became the Forces' pin-up.

Eighteen months after she first anchored ITV's News at Ten, she was poached by the BBC to launch Breakfast Time in January 1983. In contrast to Alastair Burnet and Sandy Gall, who had welcomed her at ITN, she presented the new show with Frank Bough. In a 2020 interview Scott said that Bough would deliberately undermine her by interrupting mid-question and in other ways; when she attempted to complain she said that senior management simply wasn't interested: "they seemed to have no emotional intelligence, and they let men like Frank Bough roam the BBC without any check on them". She said that there was a very sexist atmosphere at the BBC, "this malevolence".

When she left Breakfast Time, she accepted the role as presenter of the BBC's The Clothes Show (1986–1988), and was guest host on the chat show Wogan. Here she interviewed, amongst many others, Ginger Rogers and Prince Andrew. In connection with interviewing Andrew, she says he asked her out, but she managed to ignore it.

It was at this time that Albert Broccoli, the producer of the James Bond films, auditioned Scott for the role of Miss Moneypenny in The Living Daylights. "He sat me on a high stool so he and his producer could get a good eyeful," Scott told The Lady in 2013.

Scott appeared on Britain's first government-authorised satellite service, BSB, before moving to Rupert Murdoch's Sky when the two companies merged. There she co-anchored its 1992 election-night coverage with David Frost.

Scott has also produced independent documentaries on the Royals in Europe including A Prince Among Islands, a profile of Prince Charles which achieved 14 million viewers, the first in depth interview with King Juan Carlos of Spain, The Year of Spain (which also achieved record viewing figures for a documentary in Spain) and The Return of the King, returning to Greece with King Constantine and his family after 25 years of exile to which the Greek government reacted, menacing their journey by boat through the Greek islands with gunboats and aircraft. This dramatic intervention led not only to national headlines in the UK and Greece but ultimately to King Constantine appealing to the European Court of Human Rights to stop the Greek Government confiscating his passport and his Athens property. A settlement was eventually reached.

In 2007, she took part in the BBC Two series: The Underdog Show to highlight the Dogs Trust Charity for rescued animals. After six weeks of intensive training she was voted the winner with an abandoned wolfhound cross Chump, beating singer Huey Morgan and actress Julia Sawalha in the final.

In October 2008, Scott presented a four-part series for the Sky Arts channel and ITV, Edward Seago — The Forgotten Painter, and included interviews with Prince Philip, Duke of Edinburgh; who described how he and Seago explored a pristine Antarctic abroad  soon after the first official royal tour to Australia.

In 2018 Scott appeared in 4 episodes of the BBC's The Real Marigold Hotel, shot in Rajasthan, which she had always wanted to visit as her great-great-grandfather (a soldier surgeon) survived the Siege of Lucknow.

In December 2021, Scott was one of the four walkers travelling with the BBC's 360 degree camera, in the first series of BBC Four's Winter Walks. Scott's episode featured a walk through Wharfedale in the Yorkshire Dales.

United States and Donald Trump 
CBS in the United States hired her for their news show West 57th, which on one assignment took her to Kenya. For CBS, Scott gained exclusive access and revealing interviews with, amongst others, George Harrison, Prince Charles, Bono of U2 and the world chess champion Garry Kasparov.

Whilst in America, Scott interviewed Donald Trump. Her 1995 documentary for ITV about Trump was the first investigation into his honesty. Owing to a technical issue with the camera, Scott interviewed Trump twice. the programme intercut them. When it aired on ITV, Trump was shocked by its critical tone and threatened Scott with legal action and sent her numerous angry threatening letters, an issue which partly became public knowledge at the time. 

Trump warned ITV that if they sold the rights to any of the American television stations that were bidding for it, he would tie them up in the courts. ITV complied, meaning the US press and public were unable to see the documentary. It also started a long-running feud between Trump and Scott. Shortly after the interview with Trump, Scott signed a deal reportedly worth $200,000 to host her own talk show, The Selina Scott Show for NBC Super Channel.

By 1997, she was back in the UK, signing a contract with Sky reputedly for £1,000,000. She hosted the breakfast programme, later switching to the 5pm news.

Personal life

Scott lives on a  farm in a designated Area of Outstanding Natural Beauty in Yorkshire where she has created a "nature haven" for threatened species.

She has established a natural fibres business, Naturally Selina Scott, sourcing sustainable cashmere from the Gobi Desert in Outer Mongolia (a journey she made in 2016 to see for herself how the fibre is produced, and animals raised). Scott lived with the nomads in their Gers and traced the entire process from the rearing of the cashmere goats to the making of the finished garment in Ulan Batar before launching to the public.

She is the eldest of five children: her brother Robin is editor of Britain's best-selling shooting magazine, Sporting Gun and her sisters are Angela, Vanessa, and Fiona, the last a fine art portrait artist, who regularly exhibits at the Royal Society of Portrait Painters Exhibition in London. In April 2007 Fiona exhibited a long-awaited portrait of her eldest sister. Selina purchased her portrait.

At the time when Princess Diana was, like Scott, having problems with the press, Michael Shea, press secretary to the Queen, asked Scott if she would befriend the princess. He thought that Scott might be able to advise her on dealing with the press; Scott commented "the trouble was I was going through just the same as she was". Scott did befriend Diana, but they did not discuss the press.

In a departure from broadcasting, Scott wrote her first autobiographical book, A Long Walk in the High Hills: The Story of a House, a Dog and a Spanish Island, published in 2010. This book describes how Kendi, her rescued German Shepherd, came to live with her. Scott also has another dog, Nip, a female Border collie cross.

With her continuing interest in literature, Scott became Patron of the Charles Dickens Society, based in Malton, North Yorkshire, raising a public appeal to buy a rare signed edition of A Christmas Carol at auction in New York. The story of the rescue of the book found in a refuse bin in New York, and its homecoming to the market town of Malton (where the character of Scrooge and his Counting House was reputedly based) made national headlines.

In March 2012, Scott was awarded an Honorary Doctorate of Journalism degree from the University of Hull.

Activism 
Scott is an active campaigner for causes such as animal welfare and wildlife conservation, spearheading a campaign to ban the live transportation of animals in Europe after Brexit, which achieved over 100,000 signatures to initiate a debate in Parliament. She supported Brexit because of this issue.

In August 2008, Scott announced her intention to sue Channel 5, a UK television station, for age discrimination. She claimed Five reneged on an agreement for her to return to News because she was "too old". Scott hired Simon Smith of Schillings, and Five denied the claim. A preliminary hearing began on 24 September 2008 with a full five-day hearing scheduled for December 2008. On 5 December 2008 she won, with Five issuing a public apology and making a confidential out-of-court financial settlement. It was later reported that she accepted the offer, despite publicly declaring she would have her day in court, as her father had become seriously ill in December. He died on Christmas Eve and she wanted to be at his side and felt unable to continue the action as planned.

Following her claim against ageism, Age UK and Equal Justice, a legal firm, commissioned Scott to compile a report investigating the employment of women over 50 years old at the BBC. The report was delivered to Sir Michael Lyons, Chairman of the BBC Trust and Jeremy Hunt, the shadow Culture and Media Secretary in April 2010. The report accused the BBC of institutional ageism against older women.

In 2014 the Telegraph newspaper reported that Scott was considering standing for election to Parliament as a Conservative MP; Scott commented that this was nonsense, she was not even a Tory.

Charitable patronage
President: Malton Food Lovers Festival
Patron: Charles Dickens (Malton) Society
Patron: Animals Worldwide
Patron: National Star College

References

External links
 The Observer (Tim Adams) TV go home 27 August 2006

1951 births
Alumni of the University of East Anglia
BBC newsreaders and journalists
British radio journalists
British reporters and correspondents
British television newsreaders and news presenters
English radio personalities
English television journalists
English women journalists
ITN newsreaders and journalists
ITV regional newsreaders and journalists
Living people
People from Guisborough
People from Scarborough, North Yorkshire
Reality show winners
STV News newsreaders and journalists
Scottish television talk show hosts
British women television journalists
Scottish women radio presenters
Scottish women television presenters